Pentamethylcyclopentadienyl rhodium dichloride dimer is an organometallic compound with the formula [(C5(CH3)5RhCl2)]2, commonly abbreviated [Cp*RhCl2]2  This dark red air-stable diamagnetic solid is a reagent in organometallic chemistry.

Structure and preparation
The compound has idealized C2h symmetry.  Each metal centre is pseudo-octahedral.  

The compound is prepared by the reaction of rhodium trichloride trihydrate and pentamethylcyclopentadiene in hot methanol, from which the product precipitates:

It was first prepared by the reaction of hydrated rhodium trichloride with hexamethyl Dewar benzene

This complex was first prepared from hexamethyl Dewar benzene and RhCl3(H2O)3.  The hydrohalic acid necessary for the ring-contraction rearrangement is generated in situ in methanolic solutions of the rhodium salt, and the second step has been carried out separately, confirming this mechanistic description.  The reaction occurs with the formation of 1,1-dimethoxyethane, CH3CH(OCH3)2, and hexamethylbenzene is produced by a side reaction.  

This rhodium(III) dimer can be reduced with zinc in the presence of CO to produce the rhodium(I) complex [Cp*Rh(CO)2].

Reactions
Reductive carbonylation gives [Cp*Rh(CO)2].

The Rh-μ-Cl bonds are labile and cleave en route to a variety of adducts of the general formula Cp*RhCl2L.  Treatment with silver ions in polar coordinating solvents causes precipitation of silver(I) chloride, leaving a solution containing dications of the form [Cp*RhL3]2+ (L = H2O, MeCN).

The chemistry is similar to that of the analog pentamethylcyclopentadienyl iridium dichloride dimer.

Further reading (early literature)

References

Organorhodium compounds
Dimers (chemistry)
Pentamethylcyclopentadienyl complexes
Chloro complexes
Rhodium(III) compounds